State Route 237 (SR 237, now Best Road, Farm to Market Road, Mactaggart Avenue and West Bow Hill Road) was a  Washington state highway that ran from  in Fredonia, through Edison and ending at  east of Edison. The road was decommissioned in 1991.

Route description

From the terminus, the roadway turned north and crossed railroad tracks that are owned by the BNSF Railway and became Farm to Market Road. Once over the tracks, the highway passed the Skagit Regional Airport and intersected Josh Wilson Road, which travels west to Bay View. SR 237 traveled over the Samish River and later entered Edison where it curved east as Mactaggart Avenue. In 1970, the intersection with SR 11 had a daily average of 1,410 motorists, making it the most used section of the roadway as a whole. In 1991, the busiest section moved south, before the intersection with Ovenell Road, the southern connector to Skagit Regional Airport, with a daily average of 2,300 motorists.

History
SSH 1C became  during the 1964 highway renumbering.  was extended west to Discovery Bay in 1973 and two years later, in 1975, SR 537 was renumbered to SR 237. SR 237 was later removed from the highway system in 1991.

Major intersections

References

External links
Highways of Washington State

237
Transportation in Skagit County, Washington